Great Wakering is a village in the Rochford District in Essex, England. It is  
approximately four miles east of Southend. Great Wakering consists mainly of two roads: the High Street, which runs from the junction of Star Lane, and New Road, which begins outside St. Nicholas' Parish Church and runs down to the bridges for Foulness Island.

History
According to a medieval tradition, Wakering (probably Great Wakering) was the site of a monastery during the seventh century AD. Two Christian cousins of King Ecgberht of Kent, named Æthelred and Æthelberht, were murdered at Eastry, a royal dwelling in the Kingdom of Kent, during King Ecgberht's reign (664–673). They were prevented by a miracle from being buried at Canterbury, and were taken instead to an existing monastery at Wakering in the Kingdom of Essex and enshrined there as saints. Ecgberht's brother and successor, King Hlothhere of Kent, is said by William of Malmesbury to have ridiculed the idea of their sanctity.

The village church, dedicated to St. Nicholas, dates back to Norman times and the board of rectors or vicars inside begins in the year 1200 with simply "Robert", and the next incumbent equally simply named "Peter".  As well as the parish church, the village also has a United Reformed Church in Chapel Lane, a Methodist church, and an Evangelical (formerly Peculiar People) church on Great Wakering High Street.

Great Wakering is a village steeped in history. It has many community links to the Ministry of Defence-governed Foulness Island. The village was badly hit during the 1953 floods and locals fear a re-occurrence of the devastation now that tidal levels are rising and flood defences eroding. Of architectural interest is an old brickworks site (now partly demolished) at Star Lane, which was once served by an industrial narrow-gauge railway, the remains of which can still be seen in the bushes if you look carefully. Brick-making was once the main industry in Wakering.  The factory finally closed in 1991, but the four towers remained a focal point on the horizon until September 2007, when the towers were finally demolished. In 2016, planning permission was granted to build new housing on the site.

Much of the land area around Great Wakering is closed to the public as it forms part of a Ministry of Defence (MOD) firing range – the "New Ranges". When firing is not taking place, however, the MOD beach at Wakering Stairs can be accessed via a rough road at Landwick security check-in. You can also cross MOD land and walk across the range from Cupid's Corner to follow a muddy track to the seawall which offers great views over the Maplin Sands.  The MOD beach is a great spot for watching Brent geese and waders. You will find much military debris around the area such as old firing targets, railway tracks, a lookout tower and several ruined batteries.  There is also access here to the tidal path The Broomway, which leads to Fisherman's Head on Foulness Island.

Sport and leisure
The local football team Great Wakering Rovers play in the Isthmian League First Division North. Their home ground, Burroughs Park.  

Fairfax Saxons FC are a Great Wakering-based football club set up to raise awareness of men's health and to promote the community and local businesses via the medium of football.  They play in the Southend Borough Combination Veterans League.  This covers the Southend and surrounding areas.  Home games are played at The Wakering Recreation Ground.  It is a Sunday League set up.  As a club, they train every Tuesday and on Sunday when there is no game on.  They are always welcoming new players and we hope to expand to create more teams within the club.

Notable people
Leslie Stubbs - footballer for Southend United F.C. and Chelsea F.C.
Peter Sampson - footballer for Bristol Rovers F.C.
Alan McCormack - footballer for Brentford F.C.
Sir Alan Orr – Lord Justice of Appeal

Gallery

References

 
 

Villages in Essex
Rochford District
Burial sites of the House of Kent